Haiku is an unincorporated community in Maui County on the island of Maui in the state of Hawaii. For United States Census purposes, it is part of the Haiku-Pauwela census-designated place, which also includes Pauwela.

References

Unincorporated communities in Maui County, Hawaii
Populated places on Maui
Unincorporated communities in Hawaii